Santiago is a former civil parish in the municipality of Tavira, Portugal. In 2013, the parish merged into the new parish Tavira (Santa Maria e Santiago).

References

External links
  Santiago parish website

Former parishes of Tavira